Charles Brewer Hicklen (born February 9, 1996) is an American professional baseball outfielder in the Kansas City Royals organization. The Royals selected Hicklen in the seventh round of the 2017 MLB draft. He made his MLB debut in 2022.

Amateur career
Hicklen graduated from Huntsville High School in Huntsville, Alabama. He played baseball as an outfielder and football as a quarterback.

Hicklen committed to attend the University of Alabama at Birmingham (UAB), hoping to play college baseball and college football for the UAB Blazers. He played as a wide receiver for the football team until UAB ended its football program in December 2014. He looked for other football opportunities, and while waiting for scholarship offers, his baseball offer from UAB was revoked. He agreed to walk on to the baseball team. He began to focus exclusively on baseball. He took a redshirt for the baseball team in 2015. In 2016, he batted .289 with three home runs, 21 runs batted in (RBIs), and 22 stolen bases. When the football team was resurrected in 2016, he rejoined the team.

Professional career
The Kansas City Royals selected Hicklen in the seventh round, with the 210th overall selection, of the 2017 MLB draft. He became the highest-selected player from UAB in the MLB draft. After not making an Opening Day roster for a minor league team in Kansas City's farm system in 2018, he was assigned to the Lexington Legends of the Class A South Atlantic League in April and was promoted to the Wilmington Blue Rocks of the Class A-Advanced Carolina League in July. His .307 batting average and 29 stolen bases with Lexington led the team. Hicklen returned to Wilmington for the 2019 season. The 2020 season was cancelled due to the COVID-19 pandemic.

Hicklen played for the Northwest Arkansas Naturals of Double-A South in 2021. He began the 2022 season with the Omaha Storm Chasers of the Class AAA Pacific Coast League. He batted .266 with five home runs, 24 RBIs, and 11 stolen bases in 42 games. The Royals promoted Hicklen to the major leagues on May 26; he made his major league debut that night as the starting center fielder. He returned to the minor leagues on May 31 when Kyle Isbel was activated. Hicklen returned to the major leagues on July 14. He was returned to the minors on July 18. In the minor leagues in 2022, he batted .248/.348/.502 in 480 at bats, and was third in the minor leagues with 202 strikeouts.

Personal life
During the offseasons, Hicklen hosts an annual baseball camp for children at an Alabama high school.

Notes

References

External links

1996 births
Living people
Sportspeople from Huntsville, Alabama
Baseball players from Alabama
Major League Baseball outfielders
Kansas City Royals players
UAB Blazers baseball players
UAB Blazers football players
Arizona League Royals players
Idaho Falls Chukars players
Lexington Legends players
Wilmington Blue Rocks players
Northwest Arkansas Naturals players
Omaha Storm Chasers players
Surprise Saguaros players